The World Championship was a golf tournament on the LPGA Tour from 1948 to 1957. It was played at the Tam O'Shanter Country Club in Niles, Illinois. It was played concurrently with the men's World Championship of Golf on the PGA Tour as well as World Amateur events. The pre-1950 events are considered official LPGA wins.

Winners
1957 Patty Berg
1956 Marlene Hagge
1955 Patty Berg
1954 Patty Berg
1953 Patty Berg
1952 Betty Jameson
1951 Babe Zaharias
1950 Babe Zaharias
1949 Babe Zaharias
1948 Babe Zaharias

References

Former LPGA Tour events
Golf in Illinois
Niles, Illinois
Recurring sporting events established in 1948
Recurring events disestablished in 1957
History of women in Illinois